Hummer Point is the eastern point of the ice-covered Gurnon Peninsula, an eastern arm of Bear Peninsula, on the Walgreen Coast of Marie Byrd Land, Antarctica, extending into the Amundsen Sea.

Discovery and naming
The headland was mapped by the United States Geological Survey from surveys and U.S. Navy aerial photographs from 1959 to 1966, and was named by the Advisory Committee on Antarctic Names in 1977 after Dr Michael G. Hummer.

Important Bird Area
A 490 ha site on fast ice east of the headland has been designated an Important Bird Area (IBA) by BirdLife International because it supports a breeding colony of about 9,500 emperor penguinss, estimated from 2009 satellite imagery.

References

 

 
Important Bird Areas of Antarctica
Penguin colonies
Headlands of Marie Byrd Land